Antunovac may refer to:

 Antunovac, Osijek-Baranja County, a village and a municipality near Osijek, formerly known as Tenjski Antunovac
 Antunovac, Velika, a village near Velika, Požega-Slavonia County, Croatia
 Antunovac, Lipik, a village near Lipik, Požega-Slavonia County, Croatia
 Novi Antunovac, a village near Špišić Bukovica, Virovitica-Podravina County, Croatia
 Bukovački Antunovac, a village near Nova Bukovica, Virovitica-Podravina County, Croatia